El buena suerte ("The Good Luck") is a 1961 Mexican film directed by Rogelio A. González with Miguel Aceves Mejía and Sara García. It was one of three ranchera comedies that year by González based on screenplays by Janet Alcoriza (formerly Raquel Rojas) and Fernando Galiana. The other two were Paloma brava, also with Aceves Mejía and Sara Garcia, and El Jinete Negro, a western parody with an early appearance by Mauricio Garcés.

References

External links
 

1961 films
Mexican comedy films
1960s Spanish-language films
Films directed by Rogelio A. González
1960s Mexican films